Michael John Hoban (June 6, 1853 – November 13, 1926) was an American prelate of the Roman Catholic Church. He served as bishop of the Diocese of Scranton in Pennsylvania from 1899 until his death in 1926.

While Hoban was coadjutor bishop of Scranton, a schism occurred in the diocese that resulted in the formation of the Polish National Catholic Church in the United States.

Biography

Early life 
Michael Hoban was born in Waterloo Village in Byram Township, New Jersey, to Patrick and Bridget (née Hennigan) Hoban, Irish immigrants who met in the United States. Patrick Hoban was a railroad contractor working on a project in Waterloo.  The family later moved to Hawley, Pennsylvania, for Patrick to work for a canal company. Hoban attended private primary schools in Hawley, then was sent to St. Francis Xavier's College in New York City at 14.  In 1868, after one year at St. Francis, Michael Hoban entered Holy Cross College in Worcester, Massachusetts.  With the death of his father in 1871, Hoban dropped out of college to return to Hawley to help his mother with the family business.

Hoban returned to New York City to study at St. John's College in the Bronx.  After one year at St. John's, he decided to prepare for the priesthood.  He spent 1874 at St. Charles Borromeo Seminary in Overbrook, Pennsylvania. In 1875, he was sent to further his studies at the Pontifical North American College at Rome.

Priesthood 
While in Rome, Hoban was ordained to the priesthood for the Diocese of Scranton by Cardinal Raffaele Monaco La Valletta on May 22, 1880 in the Cathedral of St. John Lateran. After his return to Pennsylvania in July 1880, Hoban served as a curate at Saints Peter and Paul Parish in Towanda.  He was transferred in 1882 to be the curate at St. John's Parish in Pittston. He received his first pastorate in 1885 at St. John's Parish at Troy, Pennsylvania. In 1887, Hoban was named pastor of St. Leo's Parish in Ashley, Pennsylvania, where he established a church and rectory.

Coadjutor Bishop of Scranton 
On February 1, 1896, Hoban was appointed as coadjutor bishop of the Diocese of Scranton and titular bishop of Alalis by Pope Leo XIII. He received his episcopal consecration on March 22, 1896, from Archbishop Francesco Satolli, with Bishops Thomas McGovern and Thomas Daniel Beaven serving as co-consecrators, at St. Peter's Cathedral in Scranton  

Later in 1896, a schism erupted at Sacred Hearts Parish in the coal mining area of South Scranton.  The English-speaking miners were in the parish were suspicious of an influx of Polish immigrants into the mine fields, fearful that they would drive down wages.  The Polish parishioners did not like how their pastor, of German descent, ran the parish.  In October 1896, 250 families left the parish, built a new church and requested recognition from the diocese for St. Stanislaus as a new parish.  Hoban refused to give it.  In March 1887, Frances Hodur, a Polish priest became the pastor of St. Stanislaus;  Hoban suspended him the next week. In September 1898, Hodur submitted a compromise proposal to Hoban, which he rejected.  Hodur then traveled to Rome to appeal his case, but was rejected. In October 1898, Hoban excommunicated Hodur.  He and his congregation eventually set up the Polish National Catholic Church, establishing a permanent break with the Roman Catholic Church.

Bishop of Scranton 
Hoban automatically succeeded Bishop William O'Hara as bishop of the Diocese of Scranton on his death on February 3, 1899.

At the time of Hoban's succession in 1899, the diocese contained 152 priests, 100 parishes, and 32 parochial schools; by the time of his death in 1926, there were 341 priests, 202 parishes, 65 parochial schools, and three colleges.

Death 
Michael Hoban died on November 13, 1926, in Scranton at age 73. He is buried at the Cathedral of Scranton.

References

1853 births
1926 deaths
College of the Holy Cross alumni
Fordham University alumni
St. Charles Borromeo Seminary alumni
People from Byram Township, New Jersey
20th-century Roman Catholic bishops in the United States
Catholics from New Jersey